Norristown is a municipality with home rule status and the county seat of Montgomery County, Pennsylvania, United  States, in the Philadelphia metropolitan area. It is the fourth most populous municipality in the county and second most populous borough in Pennsylvania.

History
The area where Norristown sits was originally owned by the family of Isaac Norris. Along with William Trent, Norris purchased the land on October 7, 1704, for 50¢ per acre. In 1712, Norris acquired Trent's share and established a gristmill at the foot of present-day Water Street.

Named the county seat in 1784 when Montgomery County was formed, Norristown was incorporated as a borough in 1812 and subsequently enlarged in 1853.  About 500 people lived there at the time of its incorporation.  Growing rapidly after the Civil War, it swelled to 22,265 people by 1900. By 1940 it was home to 38,181 Norristonians, making it the most populous borough in Pennsylvania before declining in the decades after World War II, and in fact it was described in that year as "the most populous independent borough in the United States."

At its height, Norristown was an industrial, retail, banking, and government center.  Breweries, cigar factories, textile mills, icehouses, foundries, rolling mills, and lumber yards provided ample employment for skilled laborers and artisans.  The downtown featured two department stores, several theaters, and enough goods and services that residents never had to leave town to find anything they needed.  Although primarily settled by the English and a handful of Germans, Scots, Dutch, and Swedes, in the mid-1800s the Irish began arriving in large numbers, followed by waves of Italians at the turn of the century.

With the opening of new malls in nearby King of Prussia and Plymouth Meeting, the downtown declined in the decades after World War II.  Industry soon followed, as many companies closed or relocated into new industrial parks throughout Montgomery County.

Geography
Totaling 3.519 square miles in land area, the municipality sits along the Schuylkill River. Two major tributaries, the Stony Creek and the Saw Mill Run, bisect the town into thirds and empty directly into the Schuylkill. The town's terrain is generally hilly, especially in the areas closest to downtown, which itself sits on a plateau surrounded by all three major waterways.

Norristown has four distinct neighborhoods: the West End, the East End, the North End, and the downtown.

It is bounded by West Norriton, East Norriton, and Plymouth townships, as well as the borough of Bridgeport.

Climate
In the Köppen climate classification, the borough has a humid subtropical climate (Cfa) according to recent temperature numbers. The Trewartha climate classification now has the climate as Do (oceanic because only seven months are above 50 °F.) The hardiness zone is 7a.

Demographics

As of the 2019, Norristown's population is 34,341, which represents a 0% increase since 2010. The municipality's population is 37.2% black or African American, 27.9% white (non-Hispanic), 27.1% Hispanic and two or more races 6.4%.

There were 11,963 households and 7,498 families residing in the municipality. The population density was 9,753.9 people per square mile. There were 13,420 housing units at an average density of 3,813.5 per square mile.

Of the 11,963 households, 62.7% (7,498) were family households and 37.3% were non-family households.  Of the 7,498 families, 58.2% had their own and related children under the age of 18 living with them; 51.0% were married couples living together, and 36.6% had a female householder with no husband present.  The average household size was 2.79 and the average family size was 3.41.

The median age of all residents is 31.2 years, with an age distribution of 26.2% under the age of 18, 43.5% between ages 18 and 44, 21.2% between ages 45 and 64, and 9.1% ages 65 and above.

According to the U.S. Census Bureau's 2012 American Community Survey, the median household income was $42,764. Males had a median income of $34,214 versus $34,086 for females. The per capita income was $21,204.  About 17.3% of families and 19.3% of the population were below the poverty line, including 28.3% of those under the age of 18 and 11.8% of those 65 and older.

Approximately 76.0% of all persons 25 and older have a high school diploma or higher, while 16.7% have a college degree (Bachelor's or higher).

Economy

Norristown's economy is based largely on institutions in the government, healthcare, legal, and social services sectors.  The Montgomery County government is the municipality's largest employer.   Other major Norristown employers with a considerable presence are the Pennsylvania Department of Environmental Protection (DEP), the Montgomery County Intermediate Unit, USM (formerly U.S. Maintenance), U.S. Roofing Corporation, Barton Partners Architects, Crazy Aaron's, and the Norristown Area School District.  Norristown is home to the corporate headquarters of USM, U.S. Roofing and Crazy Aaron's.

In addition to major employers, there are numerous small professional, manufacturing, technology, and distribution firms operating in the municipality, as well as law offices and local realty companies.

Politics and government

Norristown has been a home rule municipality since 1986 when voters adopted a charter with a manager/council form of government and a seven-member municipal council. The office of mayor was abolished in July 2004 after a public referendum amended the municipal charter. Executive and administrative authority is now delegated to a council appointed Municipal Manager.

The municipality is part of the Fifth Congressional District (represented by Rep. Mary Gay Scanlon), the 70th State House Districts (represented by Rep. Matt Bradford) and the 17th State Senate District (represented by Sen. Amanda Cappelletti).

Infrastructure

Transportation

Norristown sits near the junction of several major roads in the Philadelphia metropolitan area. Main Street (also known as Ridge Pike outside of the municipality) and Airy Street run east–west through the downtown, eventually leading to interchanges for I-476 (the Blue Route) and the Pennsylvania Turnpike (I-276), respectively, in Plymouth Meeting.  US 202 is the major north–south route through the town, connecting it with other nearby county seats such as Doylestown and West Chester.  US 202 is split into a one-way pair through the municipality, as DeKalb Street is designated “US 202 North” while Markley Street is signed “US 202 South.”

Norristown is the largest multi-modal transportation hub in Montgomery County.  Numerous rail lines, bus routes, multi-use trails, and parking areas converge at the Norristown Transportation Center (NTC). SEPTA operates eight Suburban Division bus routes (and ), one interurban rapid transit route (the Norristown High Speed Line to 69th Street Transportation Center), and a Regional Rail line (the Manayunk/Norristown Line to Center City Philadelphia) out of the NTC complex.

The Regional Rail station at the Norristown Transportation Center is one of three on the Manayunk/Norristown Line in Norristown. The other two are Main Street and Elm Street, the latter of which serves as the terminus of the line.

The NTC contains a 522-space SEPTA commuter parking garage that also contains an intercity bus terminal that was formerly used by Bieber Transportation Group, Greyhound Lines, and Martz Trailways. Several taxi companies and private bus shuttles have a presence at the Transportation Center.  The Schuylkill River Trail, which connects Philadelphia to Pottstown and runs through downtown Norristown, also passes through the NTC complex.  The Chester Valley Trail will also connect to the Transportation Center in the future.

Utilities
Electricity and natural gas in Norristown is provided by PECO Energy Company, a subsidiary of Exelon. Water is provided by Pennsylvania American Water, a subsidiary of American Water. The Norristown Municipal Waste Authority provides sewer service, operating collection sewers and a wastewater treatment plant. Trash and recycling collection is provided under contract by J.P. Mascaro.

Media
The Times Herald is the borough's daily newspaper, printing seven days a week and serving most of Montgomery County.  Founded on June 15, 1799, it is currently owned by 21st Century Media.  The paper's staff offices are located within the municipality.

Culture

Despite the loss of its historic movie and vaudeville theaters, Norristown is home to two performing arts centers (the Montgomery County Cultural Center and Centre Theatre) and one professional theater company, Theatre Horizon.  All are part of The Theatre Alliance of Greater Philadelphia and the Greater Philadelphia Cultural Alliance.

These theaters form the nucleus for Norristown Arts Hill, a collection of theaters, art galleries, and professional firms on the 300-500 blocks of DeKalb Street in downtown.

Styles of ethnic food available on Norristown's Main Street include Korean/Japanese, Chinese, Mexican, Ethiopian, Vietnamese, and Italian.

Revitalization
 
Norristown has seen several new office buildings constructed or rehabbed over the last several decades.  One Montgomery Plaza, the municipality's iconic downtown 10-story office building, was built in the early 1970s, and is now owned by Montgomery County. Two newer mid-rise downtown office buildings, the Montgomery County Intermediate Unit Building and the Department of Environmental Protection Building, were built in the 1990s and early 2000s.  In 2009, the historic former Bell Telephone building was completely renovated for offices, and that same year the U.S. Roofing Corporation rehabbed the former Conte Luna pasta factory on East Main Street to house their operations.  The former Sears building at the Studio Centre shopping center in the North End was renovated as a modern office center.

Since the early 2000s, the Regatta Apartments, the Rittenhouse condominium building, the Luxor, and dozens of new townhouses have contributed to a residential boom in the East End.

Two new downtown parking garages were built in the late 2000s, one at Main and Cherry Streets for visitors and another at SEPTA’s Norristown Transportation Center on Lafayette Street.  Several large downtown and neighborhood streetscape projects were completed by the municipal government to install new street lighting, trees, curbing, and sidewalks along Main Street, DeKalb Street, and Powell Street.

The Lafayette Street Extension Project, a $60 million effort by Montgomery County, PennDOT, and the Federal Highway Administration (FHWA), is now open to traffic.  It has improved highway access and mobility into downtown Norristown by widening Lafayette Street and extending it eastward toward Ridge Pike and Conshohocken, with eventual connections to the Pennsylvania Turnpike (I-276) and the US 202 Dannehower Bridge.

Education
Norristown Area School District is the local school district.

St. Francis of Assisi School is located in Norristown proper.

Other area Catholic schools include Visitation B.V.M. School in West Norriton Township, near the Trooper census-designated place and near Norristown; Holy Rosary Regional Catholic School in Plymouth Meeting and Plymouth Township; and Mother Teresa Regional Catholic School in King of Prussia. Holy Rosary was formed in 2012 by the merger of St. Titus School in East Norriton, Epiphany of Our Lord School in Plymouth Meeting, and Our Lady of Victory in East Norriton. Mother Teresa formed in 2012 by the merger of St. Teresa of Avila in West Norriton and Mother of Divine Providence in King of Prussia. Both St. Titus and St. Teresa had Norristown, Pennsylvania postal addresses but were not in the city proper.

Notable locations

Elmwood Park Zoo
Norristown Farm Park
Norristown State Hospital
Norristown Transportation Center
Schuylkill River Trail
Selma Mansion
Thaddeus Lowe House

Notable people
 Nia Ali, track & field olympian
 Geno Auriemma, Hall of Fame women's basketball coach at UConn
 Maria Bello, actress (ER, A History of Violence)
 Steve Bono, former NFL quarterback
 Peter Boyle, actor (Everybody Loves Raymond, Young Frankenstein)
Harry Roberts Carson, Episcopal Bishop of Haiti
 Josh Culbreath, athlete (1957 400 m hurdles world record), actor
 Richard Derr, actor
 David C. Dolby, Medal of Honor
 Werner Erhard, founder of Erhard Seminars Training (EST)
 Jules Fisher, lighting designer
 Joseph Fornance, U.S. Congressman and Norristown Borough council president.
 Larry Glueck, football player for Villanova and 1963 NFL champion Chicago Bears, head coach for Fordham University
 Marques Green, basketball player
 Winfield Scott Hancock, field commander at Gettysburg, presidential candidate
 John F. Hartranft, Governor of Pennsylvania 1873–1879
 Soh Jaipil, first Korean to become a naturalized citizen of the United States
 Gertrude I. Johnson (1876—1961), co-founder of Johnson & Wales University, born and died in Norristown
 Maud Coan Josaphare (1886-1935), arts educator and writer
 Tommy Lasorda, manager of Los Angeles Dodgers, Baseball Hall of Famer
 Drew Lewis, CEO Union Pacific, U.S. Secretary of Transportation
 Thaddeus Lowe, Civil War-era aeronaut, scientist, and inventor
 Bobby Mitchell, professional baseball player
 William Moore, U.S. Congressman representing New Jersey 1869–1871
 Timothy L. O'Brien, journalist
 Jaco Pastorius, bass guitarist, musician
 John Pergine, NFL linebacker
 Mike Piazza, professional baseball player, Baseball Hall of Fame catcher of the New York Mets
 George Bryan Porter, Territorial Governor of Michigan
 David Rittenhouse Porter, Governor of Pennsylvania 1839–1845
 Jack Posobiec, political operative, conspiracy theorist
 Catherine Pugh, 50th Mayor of Baltimore
 Martha Settle Putney, educator and historian
 Brothers Quay (Stephen and Timothy), stop-motion animators
 Lisa Raymond, WTA tennis player
 Cam Reddish, Former Duke basketball player, current NBA player for the New York Knicks 
 Bill Schonely, broadcaster
 Richard Schweiker, U.S. Senator from Pennsylvania, Secretary of Health and Human Services
 Jimmy Smith, jazz musician
 Art Spiegelman, cartoonist, Maus
 Jerry Spinelli, author
 Kellee Stewart, actress
 Ralph B. Strassburger, newspaper publisher, thoroughbred racehorse owner
 John F. Street, Mayor of Philadelphia 2000–2008
 Roy Thomas, Philadelphia Phillies outfielder 1899-1908 and University of Pennsylvania head baseball coach
 Bobby Wine, professional baseball player, coach, manager and scout
Khalif Wyatt (born 1991), basketball player for Hapoel Holon of the Israeli Basketball Premier League

In popular culture
 Maniac Magee, author Jerry Spinelli based the fictional town of Two Mills on Norristown, where he was born.
 The X-Files, Season 4, Episode 10 ("Paper Hearts") mentions Norristown
 The Lovely Bones
 The Devil in the White City

See also

 Battle of Matson's Ford
 East Norriton Township, Pennsylvania
 Norristown Academy
 Montgomery Cemetery
 Riverside Cemetery
 West Norriton Township, Pennsylvania
 Saint Teresa of Avila School

Twin cities
  Ronse, Belgium
  Anzin, France
  M'saken, Tunisia
  Montella, Italy

References

Further reading

External links

 Official website

 
Boroughs in Montgomery County, Pennsylvania
Boroughs in Pennsylvania
County seats in Pennsylvania
Home Rule Municipalities in Montgomery County, Pennsylvania
Populated places on the Schuylkill River
Populated places established in 1784